The Skochinsky Institute of Mining (full name: National Mining Research Center – A.A. Skochinsky Institute of Mining) is an institute of mining located in Lyubertsy, Russia. It was established in 1927 as the All-Union Institute of Coal. In 1959, it merged with the Institute of Mining of the Academy of Sciences of the USSR, established in 1938. In 1962, it was named after academician Aleksandr Skochinsky.

In 1968, a branch of the Skochinsky Institute of Mining was established in Kohtla-Järve, Estonia, which researched oil shale mining.

References

External links
 

Research institutes in Russia
Research institutes in the Soviet Union
Research institutes established in 1927
1927 establishments in the Soviet Union
Mining in the Soviet Union